On 18 March 2014, a Ukrainian soldier and a Russian Cossack paramilitary were killed in the first case of bloodshed during the Russian military intervention in Ukraine and the annexation of Crimea by the Russian Federation.

Russian media and Crimean authorities stated the day after that a 17-year-old Ukrainian had been detained, but on the day following that the Crimean prosecutor denied any detentions.

None of the accounts of this event could be verified independently. The Ukrainian and the Crimean authorities provided conflicting reports of the event. The two casualties had a joint funeral attended by both Crimean and Ukrainian authorities. The event continues to be under investigation by both the Crimean authorities and the Ukrainian military.

Ukrainian version

Storming of Ukrainian military facility
On March 18, 2014, at 3 p.m, 15 masked gunmen attired in Russian uniforms without insignia, stormed the 13th Photogrammetric Center of the Central Military-Topographic and Navigation Administration in Simferopol, Crimea. The base was administered by Ukrainian soldiers and had been completely surrounded by pro-Russian and Crimean Self-Defense troops since 13 March. Pro-Russian forces demanded that the garrison surrender the base or otherwise they will take the center with force.

Although it is unclear how the incident initially began, reports emerged of a pro-Russian self-defense member attempting to scale a wall into the base compound, and being told to get back by Ukrainian guards. The argument escalated into live gunfire being exchanged by both sides and the storming of the base itself. However, civilian testimonies indicated seeing self-defense troops and militiamen preparing for a possible storming of the base prior any confrontation.

Soldier Serhiy Kokurin, a Ukrainian junior officer manning a watchtower overseeing a vehicle pool at the base, was fatally injured in the neck during the shoot-out. A second Ukrainian serviceman was shot in the neck and evacuated by several ambulances. The ambulances were granted entrance to the scene by self-defense troops, who sealed off the base to journalists. This death marked the first military fatality in the Russian takeover of Crimea. In addition to the officer, an ethnic Russian volunteer was reported killed per Crimean authorities, though it was unclear if he was killed by resisting Ukrainian troops or by accidental friendly fire (both were reported).

The storming followed with the takeover of the park located within the base's compound and the Ukrainian command center. According to civilians and journalists at the scene, a total of 15 unmarked soldiers, armed with shotguns and AK-47s, participated in the assault, supported by two military vehicles bearing the Russian flag. A Ukrainian soldier on patrol at the park was beaten by self-defense soldiers with a pair of iron rods during the capture. The soldier's condition was reported as serious, according to military accounts.

Shooting continued until the Ukrainian commander, Colonel Andriy Andryushyn, was captured. He was taken hostage, along with several other soldiers, in order to gain entry into the base's nautical building, where the remaining Ukrainian personnel had barricaded themselves on the second floor, refusing to surrender. The Ukrainian commander was interrogated by Russian troops, and allegedly declared his defection to the "People of Crimea" afterwards.

Negotiations over the surrender of the nautical building, and the Ukrainian troops inside, continued until late Tuesday evening, when talks were met over their surrender. A total of 18 remaining Ukrainian soldiers were detained and placed under arrest by gunmen. The soldiers were placed in rows and had all identification marks, weapons, and money confiscated at the behest of Crimean police. By March 24, the remaining Ukrainian troops who had been captured during the altercation were freed, unharmed.

Government reactions 
Ukrainian interim prime minister Arseniy Yatsenyuk accused Russia of a war crime over the incident. "Today, Russian soldiers began shooting at Ukrainian servicemen and this is a war crime without any expiry under a statute of limitations." Acting Ukrainian president Oleksandr Turchynov suggested that the Russian annexation of Crimea was moving from a political phase to a military phase, following the announcement of the death of a servicemen. He issued orders on the night of 18 March, allowing Ukrainian soldiers to use their weapons to defend themselves. The Ukrainian government released a statement declaring that the steps Russia was reminiscent to those taken by Nazi Germany and its annexations of territories before the start of World War 2.

The Treaty on Accession of the Republic of Crimea to Russia was signed on the same day by Vladimir Putin and the self-declared Crimean republic, formally joining the independent Republic of Crimea to the Russian Federation as two federal subjects - the Republic of Crimea and the federal city of Sevastopol.

International reactions 
British prime minister David Cameron said: "The steps taken by President Putin today to attempt to annex Crimea to Russia are in flagrant breach of international law and send a chilling message across the continent of Europe. Russia will face more serious consequences and I will push European leaders to agree further EU measures."

Russian version

Alleged "sniper"
On March 19, 2014, Russian state media organization Vesti FM, citing the Crimean government and police, reported that authorities had detained an unnamed "sniper" in connection to the killings, a 17-year-old resident of Lviv and member of Right Sector. Sergey Aksyonov, de facto Head of Crimea, confirmed the report on Twitter. Right Sector, a Ukrainian right-wing political party which was a dominant theme in Russian news coverage of Ukraine, had previously stated on February 27 that it did not have any intention to go to Crimea.

The following day, however, Interfax-Ukraine reported that Crimean prosecutor denied the arrest, its press officer stating "The information on the shooter's detention has not been confirmed. It is untrue. Unfortunately, no one has been detained yet".

Igor Girkin participation
Igor Girkin, the commander of pro-Russian forces in the War in Donbass in 2014, admitted in his interview he gave on November 20, 2014, he was in charge of the Center's assault.

Casualties

Ukraine
 Ensign (Praporshchik) Serhiy Kokurin –  killed (shot while on patrol. He received 2 shots by 5.45 mm caliber bullets, one bullet hit the heart)
 Captain Valentyn Fedun – wounded in the neck and arm
 Unidentified Ukrainian soldier – seriously injured in the head after blows from an iron bar

Crimean Self-Defense Forces
 Ruslan Kazakov (Russian volunteer from Nagolnyy, Volgograd Oblast, Don Cossack militia member, First and Second Chechen wars veteran (SOBR)) – fatality.
 Private Alexander Yukalo (Simferopol Terek Cossack Company) - shot in the thigh.
 Several other unidentified members wounded

References

Attacks in Europe in 2014
Annexation of Crimea by the Russian Federation
2014 in Ukraine
Simferopol
Battles of the Russo-Ukrainian War